Merkem is a town in the Belgian province West Flanders. It is a part (deelgemeente) of the municipality of Houthulst.

Notable people
François Mabilla (1898-1918) died during the Battle of Merkem during the First World War.

External links
Merkem @ City Review
Dutch website of Merkem

Populated places in West Flanders
Houthulst